Quran translations into Bengali Language; refers to a series of translations that were done by different authors and translators in different ages. The translation of the Quran from Arabic to Bengali began in the early nineteenth century.

Initiation of translation 
In 1389, Shah Muhammad Sagir, one of the oldest poets of Bengali literature, was the first to translate surahs of the Quran into old Bengali language.

Timeline 
Multiple translations of the Quran into Bengali were published in the nineteenth, twentieth and twenty-first centuries. Many people have done partial translations, such as Maulana Amir Uddin Basuniya. Girish Chandra Sen was the first to translate and publish the entire Quran.

In the 19th Century 

At the beginning of the nineteenth century, Maulana Amir Uddin Basunia, a resident of Matukpur, Rangpur, completed the Bengali translation of Ampara in 1808 or 1809. This was Ampara's poetic translation into the Bengali language, which became the pioneer of translations of the Quran into Bengali. Although it was a partial translation, it was printed at the litho press and had 168 pages.

Many leaders such as Haji Shariyat Ullah, Maulana Karamat and Ali Jaunpuri made great efforts in Bengal for Bengali Muslims but none of them tried to translate the Quran into Bengali.

Girish Chandra Sen (c. 1834-1910), a Brahmo missionary, was the first to translate the entire Quran into Bengali. He published it gradually between 1881 and 1883. After this translation, Akbar Ali of Patwar Bagan in Calcutta came forward to translate the Quran into Bengali.

During the British-Indian period,  Rajendranath Mitra, Pastor Taracharan Bandyopadhyay, Maulana Naimuddin of Tangail (1832-1907), Akbar Uddin of Dinajpur and a native  Christian Philip Biswas also played roles. Out all of these, Girish Chandra Sen's Bengali translation was complete and other translations were partial. It was a literal translation with a clear and smooth linguistic style. The translation had been hugely praised by various Muslim scholars and writers as an early literary work.

In the 20th Century

During British Raj
1905:  Maulana Akram Khan (1868-1968). He did translate Quran  in Bengali and Urdu.
1905: Sri Kiran Gopal Singha (1885-1942). He was first Hindu to translate Quran into Bengali.
1907: Translation of Maulavi Abbas Ali of 24 Pargana.
1911:  Muhammad Meherullah Sani (1856-1918) 'বাংলা কোরআন শরিফ'
1913 : Alauddin Ahmad (1851-1915) and Hafez Mahmud Shah. It was published at  Kolkata.
1914 : Maulana Khondkar Abul Fazl Abdul Karim (1876-1947) 'কোরআন',  Tangail.
1916 :Munshi Karim Bakhsh, from Kolkata.
1917:  Abdul Sattar Sufi, from.Kolkata.
1917:  Maulana Muhammad Ruhul Amin (1875-1945).
1920:  Maulana Yar Ahmad (   -1944). 'আমপারা বাঙ্গালা তফসির', Dhaka.
1922:  Mohammod Abdul Hakim (1887-1957) and Mohammod Ali Hasan  of Gopalganj. 'কোরআন শরিফ', from Kolkata.
1923:  Maulana Sheikh Idris Ahmad. 'কোরআনের মহাশিক্ষা'.
1924:  Maulana Fazel Maqimi Two para of Quran.
1925:  Faizuddin Ahmed (1899-1935). from Dhaka.
1926:  Maulana Khondkar Golam Rosul of Jhenaidah  'বাঙ্গালা পাঞ্জ সুরাহ'.
1927:  M. Abdur Rashid Siddiki of Cox's Bazar  'মহা কোরআন কাব্য' from Kolkata.
1928:  Maulana Osman Goni of Bardwaman 'পঞ্চমণি' from Kolkata.
1928:  Maulana Ahmod Ali of Jessore (1898-1959).
1929:  Maulana Kafil Uddin Siddiki 'তরজমা পাঞ্জে সুরা' from Kolkata.
1930:  Fazlur Rahim Chowdhury  'কোরআন শরিফ', Kolkata.
1930:  Morshed Ali 'কোরআন দর্পণ', Dhaka.
1930:  Mir Fazle Ali (1898-1939). 'কোরআন কণিকা', from Kolkata.
1931:  Muhammod Azhar Uddin of Rajbari. 'কোরআনের আলো' from Kolkata.
1932:  Abdul Aziz Hindi (1867-1926) of Kumilla .'কোরআন শরিফ' from Noakhali.
1933  : Kazi Nazrul Islam  'কাব্য আমপারা' in poetic Bangla from Kolkata.
1934:  Saiyed Abul Khair Tajul Awliya 'বাংলা কোরআন শরিফ', from Tangail.
1935:  Saiyed Abul Mansur  'কোরআন কুসুমাঞ্জলি'.
1936:  Ayub Ali Chowdhury (1877-1936) 'স্বর্গীয় কানন' from Kolkata.
1936: Maulana Muhammad Golam Akbar 'আমপারার তফসির' from Jessore.
1937:  Basanta Kumar Mukhopadyaya was first Kulin Brahmin to translate Quran. 'পবিত্র কোরআন প্রবেশ'. Dhaka.
1939:  Muhammad Ismail of Chandpur 'আমপারার তরজমা' from Tripura.
1940:  Muhamnad Shamsul Huda of Narshindi 'নেয়ামুল কোরআন' from Dhaka.
1941:  Khan Bahadur Ahsan Ullah (1873-1965). from.Kolkata
1944:  Mezanur Rahman of Brahman Baria 'নূরের ঝলক' or 'কোরআনের আলো' from Kolkata.
1945:  Maulana Zulfikar Ali of Feni from Chattagram.
1946:  D. Muhamnad Shahid Ullah (1885-1969). 'মহাবাণী'. from Bogura.
1947 : Maulana Muneer Uddin Ahmod of Rangpur 'হাফিজিল কাদেরী' from Rangpur.

During 1947-1971

1962 : Ashraf Ali Thanwi 'তাফসিরে আশরাফী'
1963: Khondkar Mohammod Hucain 'সহজ পাক তফসির', from Tangail.
1966-67 : Kazi Abdul Wadud 'পবিত্র কোরান', from Faridpur and Kolkata.
1967:  Ali Haidar Chowdhury 'কোরআন শরিফ',
1967:  Maulana Belayet Hossain and orhers.'কোরআনুল করিম' from  Dhaka.
1968:  Mohammod Sayid Ibrahimpuri 'কোরআনের মুক্তাহার', from Chandpur.
1969:  Hakim Abdul Mannan 'কোরআন শরিফ', from Dhaka.
1970:  M. Nurul Islam 'তাফাসরুল কোরআন' from Bogura.

From 1971 to 2000
1970-72:  Maulana M. Taher  'আল-কোরআন : তরজমা ও তাফসির'
1974:  Maulana Nurur Rahman of 1909 'তাফসিরে বয়ানুল কোরান' from Dhaka.
1974:  Mobarak Karim Jauhar 'কোরআন শরিফ', from Kolkata.
1977:  A K M Fazlur Rahman Munshi 'পবিত্র কোরআন শরিফ', from Kumilla.
1978-79: 'তাফহিমুল কোরআন : কোরআন মজিদের বাংলা তাফসির'৷
1980:  Maulana Muhidden Khan 'তাফসিরে মা'রেফুল কোরআন'
1982:  M. Khurshid Uddin 'তাফসিরে জালালাইন' (translation).
1988:  D.M.Mujibur Rahman and Akter Faruk 'তাফসিরে ইবনে কাছির', অধ্যাপক আখতার ফারুক, 
1992:  D. Osman Goni 'কোরআন শরিফ' Mallik Brothers, Kolkata.
1993:  Farid Uddin Masud translation 'তাফসির-ই জালালাইন', Islamic foundation.
1994 : Saudi Embassy বাংলা অনুপবিত্র কোরআনুল করিম বাদ ও সংক্ষিপ্ত তাফসির' from Dhaka.
1994:  Maulana M. Aminul Islam 'তাফসিরে নূরুল কোরআন', Al Balagh Publications.
1994: M. Obayedur Rahman Mallik 'তাফসিরে মাজেদি শরিফ', Islamic foundation.
1991-95:  Malana M. Sakhawat Ullah  'তাফসিরে তাবারি শরিফ', Islamic foundation.
1995:  Hafiz Muneer Uddin Ahmod 'তাফসির ফি যিলালিল কোরআন', Al Koran Academy.
1995: Maulana M A Bashir Uddin 'ছহীহ বঙ্গানুবাদ কোরআন শরিফ', Dhaka.
1996-97:  Mahmud Hasan Deobandi and Shabbir Ahmad Usmani  'তাফসিরে উসমানী' (Translated), from Islamic foundation.
1997 : D. Muhammad Mustafizur Rahman 'কোরান শরিফ', from Khosroz kitab mohol.
1998 : Maulana Abul Bashar Muhammad Saiful Islam and Maulana Mazhar Uddin Ahmad of Charchina.
1999 : Sadar Uddin Chisti 'তাফসিরে কোরআন',
2000 : Justice Habibur Rahman.'কোরআন শরিফ : সরল বঙ্গানুবাদ', from Dhaka.

In the 21st Century 
2002 : Koran Sharif: সহজ সরল বাংলা অনুবাদ, Hafez Munir Uddin Ahmed, Al Koran Academy.
2006 :ছন্দোবদ্ধ বাংলা কোরআন, Panna Chowdhury, Gontobyo Prokashani, Dhaka.
2006 : 'পবিত্র আল কোরআনের পুঁথি অনুবাদ', Maulana Abdul Hameid Qasemi, aus New Hamidia Prokashan.
2007: "কুর'আনুল কারীম" by D. Mujibur Rahman, 3rd edition, Darussalam Publications, Kingdom of Saudi Arabia.
2010 : 'কোরআন শরিফ', Abdullah Yusuf Ali, Maulana Mufti Muhammad Zakaria,  Meena Book House.
2011 : 'নূর নূরানি বাংলা উচ্চারণ', Bangla Translation and commentary on revelation.  Maulana Osman Gani, Solemania Book House.
2012 : 'বঙ্গানুবাদ কোরআন শরিফ', Maulana Muhammad Abdur Rahim (Rah), Khairun Prokashani.
2013 : Tafsir of Abu Bakr Zakaria.
2017 : তাফসিরে তাওযিহুল কোরআন, Origin: Muhammad Taqi Usmani's translation: Maulana Abul Bashar Muhammad Saiful Islam. Maktabatul Ashraf.
2018 : 'সহজ কোরআন', Asif Shibgat Bhuiyan, from Adarsha Library.
2020 :Maulana Muhibur Rahman Khan "আল কুরআনের কাব্যানুবাদ", from Rahnuma Prokashani,  Dhaka.
2021: Mufti Abu Umama Qutubuddin Mahmud und Mufti Abdullah Shihab. "আল কুরআন শব্দে শব্দে অর্থ" from Dhaka.

()

Comparison

See also 

 Quran translations
 List of translations of the Quran

References

Quran translations
Quran translators
Bengali-language books
Bengali-language culture
Quran translations by language